Intercalation or embolism in timekeeping is the insertion of a leap day, week, or month into some calendar years to make the calendar follow the seasons or moon phases. Lunisolar calendars may require intercalations of both days and months.

Solar calendars 

The solar or tropical year does not have a whole number of days (it is about 365.24 days), but a calendar year must have a whole number of days. The most common way to reconcile the two is to vary the number of days in the calendar year.

In solar calendars, this is done by adding to a common year of 365 days, an extra day ("leap day" or "intercalary day") about every four years, causing a leap year to have 366 days (Julian, Gregorian and Indian national calendars).

The Decree of Canopus, which was issued by the pharaoh Ptolemy III Euergetes of Ancient Egypt in 239 BCE, decreed a solar leap day system; an Egyptian leap year was not adopted until 25 BC, when the Roman Emperor Augustus successfully instituted a reformed Alexandrian calendar.

In the Julian calendar, as well as in the Gregorian calendar, which improved upon it, intercalation is done by adding an extra day to February in each leap year. In the Julian calendar this was done every four years. In the Gregorian, years divisible by 100 but not 400 were exempted in order to improve accuracy. Thus, 2000 was a leap year; 1700, 1800, and 1900 were not.

Epagomenal days are days within a solar calendar that are outside any regular month. Usually five epagomenal days are included within every year (Egyptian, Coptic, Ethiopian, Mayan Haab' and French Republican Calendars), but a sixth epagomenal day is intercalated every four years in some (Coptic, Ethiopian and French Republican calendars).

The Solar Hijri calendar, used in Iran, is based on solar calculations and is similar to the Gregorian calendar in its structure, and hence the intercalation, with the exception that its epoch the Hijrah.

The Bahá'í calendar includes enough epagomenal days (usually 4 or 5) before the last month (ʿalāʾ) to ensure that the following year starts on the March equinox. These are known as the Ayyám-i-Há.

Lunisolar calendars 
The solar year does not have a whole number of lunar months (it is about 365/29.5 = 12.37 lunations), so a lunisolar calendar must have a variable number of months in a year. Regular years have 12 months, but embolismic years insert a 13th "intercalary" or "leap" or "embolismic" month every second or third year (see blue moon). Whether to insert an intercalary month in a given year may be determined using regular cycles such as the 19-year Metonic cycle (Hebrew calendar and in the determination of Easter) or using calculations of lunar phases (Hindu lunisolar and Chinese calendars). The Buddhist calendar adds both an intercalary day and month on a usually regular cycle.

Lunar calendars 

In principle, lunar calendars do not employ intercalation because they do not seek to synchronise with the seasons and the motion of the moon is astronomically predictable. However, religious lunar calendars rely on actual observation.

The Lunar Hijri calendar, the purely lunar calendar observed by most of Islam, depends on actual observation of the first crescent of the moon and consequently does not have any intercalation. Each month still has either 29 or 30 days, but due to the variable method of observations employed, there is usually no discernible order in the sequencing of either 29 or 30-day month lengths. Traditionally, the first day of each month is the day (beginning at sunset) of the first sighting of the hilal (crescent moon) shortly after sunset. If the hilal is not observed immediately after the 29th day of a month (either because clouds block its view or because the western sky is still too bright when the moon sets), then the day that begins at that sunset is the 30th. 

The tabular Islamic calendar, used in Iran, has 12 lunar months that usually alternate between 30 and 29 days every year, but an intercalary day is added to the last month of the year 12 times within a 33-year cycle. Some historians also linked the pre-Islamic practice of Nasi' to intercalation.

Leap seconds 
The International Earth Rotation and Reference Systems Service can insert or remove leap seconds from the last day of any month (June and December are preferred). These are sometimes described as intercalary.

Other uses 
ISO 8601 includes a specification for a 52/53-week year. Any year that has 53 Thursdays has 53 weeks; this extra week may be regarded as intercalary.

The xiuhpōhualli (year count) system of the Aztec calendar had five intercalary days after the eighteenth and final month, the nēmontēmi, in which the people reflect on the past year and do fasting.

See also 
 Lunisolar calendar
 Egyptian, Coptic, and Ethiopian calendars
 Iranian calendar
 Islamic calendar
 Mandaean calendar
 Celtic calendar
 Thai lunar calendar
 Bengali calendar
 Igbo calendar
 World Calendar
 Intercalated Games

References 

Calendars
Units of time